Facundo Nicolás Quiroga (born 16 May 1985 in Garin, Buenos Aires) is an Argentine football player. He plays for Estudiantes San Luis of the Torneo Federal A in Argentine.

External links
 Argentine Primera statistics

1985 births
Living people
Sportspeople from Buenos Aires Province
Argentine footballers
Association football defenders
Argentinos Juniors footballers
Atlético Tucumán footballers
Argentine Primera División players